The PLK Best Polish Player award is an annual award in the Polish PLK that is given to the best player with a Polish nationality. Players, coaches and press members vote for the winner of the award.

Winners

References

External links
Polska Liga Koszykówki - Official Site 
Polish League at Eurobasket.com

Best Polish Player